Sparrmannia is a genus of scarab beetles belonging to the subfamily Melolonthinae. Though the name was originally spelled as Sparmannia, a subsequent emendation of this spelling is in prevailing usage and therefore conserved under ICZN Article 23.9.1.

Species
 Sparrmannia acicularis Evans, 1989
 Sparrmannia alopex (Fabricius, 1787)
 Sparrmannia angola Evans, 1989
 Sparrmannia bechuana Peringuey, 1904
 Sparrmannia boschimana Peringuey, 1904
 Sparrmannia capicola Peringuey, 1904
 Sparrmannia dekindti Nonfried, 1906
 Sparrmannia discrepans Peringuey, 1904
 Sparrmannia distincta Peringuey, 1904
 Sparrmannia falcata Evans, 1989
 Sparrmannia flava Arrow, 1917
 Sparrmannia flavofasciata (Burmeister, 1855)
 Sparrmannia fusciventris (Boheman, 1857)
 Sparrmannia gonaqua Peringuey, 1904
 Sparrmannia namaqua Peringuey, 1904
 Sparrmannia namibia Evans, 1989
 Sparrmannia obscura Evans, 1989
 Sparrmannia peringueyi Evans, 1989
 Sparrmannia prieska Peringuey, 1904
 Sparrmannia pseudotransvaalica Evans, 1989
 Sparrmannia similis Arrow, 1917
 Sparrmannia transvaalica Peringuey, 1904
 Sparrmannia tridactyla Evans, 1989
 Sparrmannia ursina Evans, 1989
 Sparrmannia vicina Evans, 1989
 Sparrmannia werneri Lacroix, 2004

References

	

Melolonthinae
Scarabaeidae genera